The 2014 Copa do Brasil Second Round will be played from 22 April to 24 July 2014, to decide the 20 teams advancing to the Third Round. This round took a break for the 2014 FIFA World Cup.

Second round

|}

Match 41

Vasco da Gama won 3–2 on aggregate.

Match 42

Tied 2–2 on aggregate, Ponte Preta won on penalties.

Match 43

Novo Hamburgo won 3–0 on aggregate.

Match 44

ABC won 3–2 on aggregate.

Match 45

Santos won 6–3 on aggregate.

Match 46

Tied 3–3 on aggregate, Londrina won on away goals.

Match 47

Palmeiras won 4–2 on aggregate.

Match 48

Tied 4–4 on aggregate, Avaí won on away goals.

Match 49

Fluminense advanced directly due to winning by 2 or more goals difference.

Match 50

América de Natal won 3–2 on aggregate.

Match 51

Corinthians advanced directly due to winning by 2 or more goals difference.

Match 52

Bahia won 2–1 on aggregate.

Match 53

Santa Cruz won 3–2 on aggregate.

Match 54

Santa Rita won 7–2 on aggregate.

Match 55

São Paulo won 4–2 on aggregate.

Match 56

Tied 3–3 on aggregate, Bragantino won on penalties.

Match 57

Coritiba advanced directly due to winning by 2 or more goals difference.

Match 58

Tied 4–4 on aggregate, Paysandu won on away goals.

Match 59

Internacional won 5–2 on aggregate.

Match 60

Ceará won 3–2 on aggregate.

Notes

References

2014 Copa do Brasil